Harry Samit is a retired Federal Bureau of Investigation Special Agent who was based at the FBI Field Office in Minneapolis, Minnesota. He is a former United States Navy Naval Intelligence Officer who participated in aviation indoctrination training and then served in aviation units for most of his career.  Samit's aeronautical ratings consist of an Air Transport Canada (Canadian) certified private pilot license. He is also a qualified FBI Aviator. Samit is most noted for arresting Zacarias Moussaoui on August 16, 2001.

Samit became aware of Moussaoui the day before because of Clancy Prevost, a certified flight instructor at the Pan-Am International Flight Academy in Eagan, Minnesota. Moussaoui had enrolled for training in a 747-400 flight simulator at the school on August 13 but his behavior during instruction alarmed Prevost, who did not believe that Moussaoui was just a wealthy individual interested in flying jumbo jets. At Prevost's urging, the flight school contacted the Minneapolis FBI Field Office, and Samit was one of the special agents assigned to investigate Moussaoui.

Moussaoui was arrested by Agents of the Minneapolis Joint Terrorism Task Force (JTTF), using the authority of assigned Immigration and Naturalization Service (INS) Agents for a visa violation on August 16. Since Moussaoui denied consent to search his hotel room at the Residence Inn in Eagan, MN where he had been staying, Agents were unable to look through his belongings or take an image of his laptop computer. The arrest team was only able to search Moussaoui's person and the items in his possession at the time he was taken into custody. Moussaoui's companion, Hussain Al Attas, did give consent to search his car. Samit found a small knife in Moussaoui's left pocket and another FBI Agent found a second knife in the car. 

As an FBI pilot himself, Samit was suspicious, suspecting that Moussaoui was plotting an act of international terrorism against the United States. He therefore sought permission to search Moussaoui's belongings which were known to include several bags and suitcases, and a laptop computer. The first application to obtain a criminal search warrant was denied by FBI Headquarters on the ground of insufficient evidence. A second application to search was made under the Foreign Intelligence Surveillance Act of 1978, but this was also denied. The FBI did obtain a search warrant for the belongings, but only after the September 11th attacks. The Minneapolis Field Office had received a report from Moussaoui's home government of France that linked him to Islamic terrorism, but the FBI Headquarters in Washington did not believe that evidence was sufficient to present to the FISA court for a search warrant.  On the question of using foreign government intelligence to validate a request for a domestic search warrant through the FISA court, it is unclear if the Field Office could have appealed administratively to the White House National Security Council.  Had the belongings been opened before September 11, knives, flight manuals, and other clues would have been found.  Whether these clues would have sparked a national emergency or simply been treated like the August 6 memo entitled Bin Ladin Determined To Strike in US is subject to debate.

When FBI Headquarters denied both Samit's application for search powers, he initiated a process to notify the Federal Aviation Administration (FAA) of his suspicions of possible aircraft hijacking attempts, but FBI Headquarters censored the memo. Relying on personal contacts, Samit then met with a Minneapolis FAA official, but that official did not pursue Samit's leads.

"I am so desperate to get into his computer, I'll take anything," Samit wrote in an e-mail on September 10, 2001.

In March 2006, during Moussaoui's death sentence trial, Samit testified that he had spent the time between August 16 and September 11 trying to warn U.S. officials about the possibility of terrorist actions involving the hijacking of aircraft. Four such actions occurred in the United States on September 11, 2001. Samit testified under oath that "criminal negligence, obstruction and careerism"  by superiors at FBI Headquarters in Washington, DC thwarted an opportunity to prevent the September 11th attacks.

Mohamad Elzahabi was "branded an al-Qaeda terrorist" and arrested by Samit on April 16, 2004.

References

External links
 
 

Year of birth missing (living people)
Living people
Federal Bureau of Investigation agents
People associated with the September 11 attacks